Andreyevka is a rural locality (a village) in Zarechensky Selsoviet, Kugarchinsky District, Bashkortostan, Russia. The population was 17 as of 2010. There is 1 street.

Geography 
Andreyevka is located 27 km northwest of Mrakovo (the district's administrative centre) by road. Voskresenskoye is the nearest rural locality.

References 

Rural localities in Kugarchinsky District